Mission of the Crossroad Palms is an album by the American musician Steve Forbert, released in 1995. It was a commercial disappointment.

Production
Mission of the Crossroad Palms was produced by Garry Tallent; it was his second time producing Forbert. The album was recorded in less than a week, and followed Forbert and Tallent's work on a song for the Harry Nilsson tribute album For the Love of Harry: Everybody Sings Nilsson. Benmont Tench played on Mission. Its lyrics deal with the regrets and realities of middle age.

Critical reception

Calling Mission of the Crossroad Palms "the latest of Steve Forbert's mediocre comeback albums," Stereo Review wrote that "while he still has a graceful way with a melody, Forbert has virtually nothing to say." The Pittsburgh Post-Gazette thought that the album "derives most of its energy from Forbert's mastery of broad musical arrangements and nuanced phrasing that insinuates itself with each successive play." The Philadelphia Inquirer concluded that the "folk-rock tunes ... sometimes match John Prine for lyrical inventiveness."

The Orlando Sentinel wrote that "Forbert often sounds as if he's forcibly squeezing the sounds out of his throat, but his baritone is nice and warm nonetheless." The Chicago Tribune determined that the album "finds the high-pitched, raspy-voiced singer-songwriter couching his searching, midlife lyrics in thoughtful folk-rock arrangements." The Province praised the "conscientious, heartfelt observations" and "attention to simple craftsmanship." The Calgary Herald deemed it "arguably his best."

AllMusic wrote that Forbert "has flowered into a distinctive, broad-based songwriter."

Track listing

References

Steve Forbert albums
1995 albums
Giant Records (Warner) albums